Hua Dongdong (born 2 August 1999) is a Chinese para-swimmer, who won bronze in the men's 400 metre freestyle S11 event at the 2020 Summer Paralympics.

References

1999 births
Living people
Chinese male freestyle swimmers
Chinese male butterfly swimmers
Chinese male medley swimmers
S11-classified Paralympic swimmers
Paralympic swimmers of China
Paralympic silver medalists for China
Paralympic bronze medalists for China
Swimmers at the 2020 Summer Paralympics
Medalists at the 2020 Summer Paralympics
Chinese people with disabilities
Paralympic medalists in swimming
Sportspeople from Ningbo
21st-century Chinese people